The F-class submarine was built for the Royal Navy as a coastal submarine based on the doubled hulled V-class submarine (World War I) with very few minor improvements. The only important improvement was the addition of a stern torpedo tube. The F class were ordered as a successor to the E-class submarine, but only three were built out of the ten ordered, the first F1  at Chatham.

During World War I, the F-class submarines were primarily used for coastal defence. All three survived the war and ended their service as training boats at Campbeltown. F1 and F3 were scrapped in 1920, F2 was sold in 1922.

Boats
 , launched 1915
 , launched 1917
 , launched 1916

References

External links
 Chatham submariners

F class submarines, British